The 2020 season was Lion City Sailors' 25th consecutive season in the top flight of Singapore football and in the Singapore Premier League. Along with the Singapore Premier League, the club will also compete in the Singapore Cup.

Squad

SPL squad

U19 squad

Coaching staff

Transfer

Pre-season transfer

In 

Note 1: Kenji Syed Rusydi returned to the team after the loan and move to Tanjong Pagar United.

Out

Extension / Retained

Promoted

Trial

Trial (In)

Trial (Out)

Mid-season transfer

In

Out

Loan Out

Friendlies

Pre-season friendlies

Tour of Malaysia

Team statistics

Appearances and goals

Competitions

Overview

Singapore Premier League

Singapore Cup

See also 
 2012 Home United FC season
 2013 Home United FC season
 2015 Home United FC season
 2016 Home United FC season
 2017 Home United FC season
 2018 Home United FC season
 2019 Home United FC season

Notes

References 

Lion City Sailors FC seasons
Lion City Sailors F.C.